People's joint association (also Manmingongdonghue(만민공동회) or Kwanmingongdonghoe(관민공동회)) was a civic group and congress of mass people in Korean Empire, 1897. a  subordinate office of Independence Club.

The first People's joint association was a congress was held by the Independence Club. and the later part of the congress was Korean peoples autonomy. Its founders werenSeo Jae-pil, Yun Chi-ho, and Lee Sang-jae.

Activity
founder of Seo Jae-pil, Yun Chi-ho, Lee Sang-jae, there was a member of Independence club. Also Manmingongdonghoi's vip members were Seo Jae-pil, Yu Gil-chun, Yun Chi-ho, Ahn Chang-ho, Lee Sang-jae, Syngman Rhee.

Manmingongdongheo was first held on 1896. On March 10, 1897, criticizing an intervention of Russia. Ten thousand Seoul citizens attended the congress. Within ten days, the Korean Empire government agreed the decisions of Manmingongdonghoe and Russia conceded to Korean order. The congress grew more and more, and insisted on various rights of people and protection of concessions from the great Powers.

Gojong ordered Lee Jong-gun, special officer of Gungnaebu to dissolve the joint but, Lee participated in it and became a member.

first congress was Independence Club also latter part congress was Korean peoples autonomy. 
 
On October 12, the congress succeed in founding a reform-minded government composed of innovative officials such as Mihn Yong-hwan and Park Jeong-yang. The new government agreed to establish a national assembly. However pro-Russians and conservatives who hated Manmingongdonghoe, spread a rumor that the congress will revolt and expel Emperor Gojong. Gojong surprised and ordered the troops to dissolve the congress.

Significance
Manmingongdonghoe spread thoughts of human rights, democracy and patriotism among Korean people.

Further reading 
Oh Se-ung, Dr. Philip Jaisohn's Reform Movement, 1896-1898: A Critical Appraisal of the Independence Club, University Press of America, 1995,

See also
Independence Club
Tongnip Sinmun
Independence Gate
Seo Jae-pil
Yun Chi-ho
Ahn Chang-ho
Syngman Rhee
Kim Kyu-sik
Lee Sang-jae

Site Link 
 독립신문과 만민공동회 
 People's joint association 
 People's joint association 
 "헌법 기원은 만민공동회 '헌의6조'" 연합뉴스 
 서울지역 대학생들 서울역서 만민공동회…“朴 응답하라” Go발뉴스 2013.02.05

References 

Civil rights and liberties
Korean Empire
Soh Jaipil
Yun Chi-ho
Liberal parties in Asia
Defunct liberal political parties
Human rights organizations based in Korea